Don Valley Festival (previously known as the 'Mexborough and District Music and Drama Festival') was established in 1912.

The Festival is accredited to the British & International Federation of Festivals.
The Festival is a Registered Charity within the United Kingdom, with registered charity number: 1043437.

References

External links
 Don Valley Festival Website
 British & International Federation of Festivals Website
 Don Valley Festival Facebook Page

Arts festivals in England
Festivals in South Yorkshire